Being as an Ocean is an American post-hardcore band from Alpine, California, formed in 2011. They have released five studio albums: Dear G-d..., How We Both Wondrously Perish, a self-titled album, Waiting for Morning to Come, released on 8 September 2017, and PROXY: An A.N.I.M.O. Story, released in 2019. How We Both Wondrously Perish was released in May 2014 and charted at number 57 on the Billboard 200 in the U.S.

History

Years as Vanguard and Dear G-d... (2011–2013)
Being as an Ocean was originally named Vanguard, where they played extreme metal with a Christian message, however, as their sound was experimented with more, they began to lose interest in playing metal and instead pursued a more post-hardcore sound. Demo versions of the songs "The Hardest Part Is Forgetting Those You Swore You Would Never Forget" and "Humble Servant, Am I" were streamed on Vanguard's MySpace page on January 4, 2011. The band thereafter changed their name to Being as an Ocean.

Guitarist Tyler Ross wrote the whole first album right after the band's formation. Dear G-d... was tracked in an old hotel called The Palms and was sent to Brian Hood to be mixed and mastered. The first single from the album was its title track, which was released on January 3, 2012, and was met with positive acclaim. Shortly after, Jacob Prest joined the band as rhythm guitarist. Being as an Ocean toured over twenty countries including Canada, Germany, Georgia, Austria, the United Kingdom and Australia with support from bands such as Counterparts, Hundredth, Sierra, Liferuiner, Napoleon, and The Elijah. They released a b-side from Dear G-d... titled "The People Who Share My Name" on August 5, 2013.

Line-up changes, How We Both Wondrously Perish and self-titled album (2013–2015)
In 2013, Shad Hamawe and Jacob Prest left the band to pursue lives outside of the band due to the intense touring schedule. The remaining members started recording as well as auditioning for new members. Connor Denis, of the hardcore punk band Sleep Patterns, joined the band as their new drummer. With this new line-up, they began writing and recording for their new album that would be released sometime in 2014. Michael McGough, of the post-hardcore band The Elijah, was also announced as the new guitarist for the band. On February 25, they revealed the album art of their second album, How We Both Wondrously Perish and announced its release date. A single from the album, "Death's Great Black Wing Scrapes the Air", was released on iTunes. The band recorded the album in Atlanta, Georgia at Glow in the Dark Studios with Matt McClellan and released it on May 6, 2014.

Shortly after, the band revealed that they were working on a third album that will be released in 2015. They played the entirety of 2015's Warped Tour. On May 7, they released "Little Richie", the first song from the new album and revealed the cover and release date for the album, which will be self-titled. The band released "Sleeping Sicarii", "Forgetting Is Forgiving the I", and "Sins of The Father" as additional singles. Being as an Ocean was released on June 29, 2015.

Waiting for Morning to Come (2015–present)
On October 11, 2015, Tyler Ross revealed on his Twitter account that he was working on a new Being as an Ocean song. In a series of tweets, he confirmed that he was still working on that song, as well as another new song for the band. It has yet to be confirmed if these songs will be part of a fourth album, an EP or be released as stand-alone singles. On November 21, it was revealed that Connor Dennis was parting ways with the band in order to pursue a career as a professional session and touring drummer.

On February 25, the band released "Dissolve" as a stand-alone single, announcing their signing to Equal Vision Records and using Jesse Shelley (Sleepwave live drummer) as their new drummer.

During the last weeks of 2016, Being as an Ocean announced that their fourth studio album Waiting for Morning to Come would be released on June 9, 2017, however, the album did not meet this release date. It was met with an unexpected delay with no explanation given at the time by the band or Equal Vision why the album hadn't been released. On August 14, 2017, Tyler Ross confirmed that he had bought and secured the rights to the album and that the band would be releasing it independently on September 8. The band officially stated on their Facebook account on August 19 that they have become an independent band after buying out their contract with Equal Vision. The band would release two singles from the album in the weeks that followed, the first of these being "Thorns" and the second being "Black and Blue", which had been performed live prior to its release.
On July 20, 2018 the band released the single "Alone".

In an interview with Dead Press! on November 4, 2018, whilst touring in London as part of the Impericon Never Say Die! Tour, Michael McGough confirmed that the band had recorded a new album with 11 tracks, and expect to release it early 2019.

Musical style and influences 
The band's musical style has been described as post-hardcore melodic hardcore, post-rock, and spoken word. AllMusic writer Gregory Heaney characterised them as a "post-hardcore band with a melodic and plaintive sound punctuated by outbursts of aggression" while Indie Vision Music stated their music blended "melodic hardcore, Explosions in the Sky-esque atmospheric rock, and spoken word "talk music" similar to La Dispute, Listener, or MewithoutYou". Vocalist Joel Quartuccio has been noted for a "passionate vocal delivery" with his "mix of spoken word and traditional pained yelled/screamed vocals paint[ing] passionate tapestries". The addition of Connor Denis and Michael McGough to the line-up marked a transition in their style, while their first album Dear G-d... "showcased a lot of human emotion through its ultra-personal lyricism, How We Both Wondrously Perish unleashed much of its emotion in shining musicality, as the group tightened up their instrumentation and added new dynamics to their sound – the biggest being the addition of guitarist/clean vocalist Michael McGough".

The lyrics for their debut album, referred to as "heartfelt", talk about life experiences, emotions, ideas and conversations Quartuccio "had about G-d, hope, love, humility, strength, pain, depression, loss and Life". Throughout the later albums, these continue to be the principal inspiration for the lyrics. Although they are often considered a Christian band, they denied that, saying that they are "Christian people who love to write music" and would prefer not to be placed under the "Christian band" tag.

Some of the early influences to their sound were MewithoutYou, Sigur Rós, Oceana, Bring Me the Horizon, Listener, Verse, Comeback Kid, Underoath, Touché Amoré, and La Dispute. The band's name was influenced by a quote spoken by Mahatma Gandhi; "You must not lose faith in humanity. Humanity is like an ocean; if a few drops of the ocean are dirty, the ocean does not become dirty".

Members

Current members
 Joel Quartuccio – lead vocals (2011–present)
 Michael McGough – bass (2021–present); vocals (2013–present); rhythm guitar (2013–2021)

Current touring musicians
 David Baqi – guitars (2021–present)
 Louis Doran – drums (2022–present)

Former members
 Tyler Ross – lead guitar (2011–2021)
 Ralph Sica – bass (2011–2021)
 Shad Hamawe – drums, percussion (2011–2013)
 Jacob Prest – rhythm guitar, vocals (2011–2013)
 Connor Denis – drums, percussion (2013–2015)
 Garrett Harney – drums (2018–2021)

Former touring musicians
 Anthony Ghazel – drums (2017–2018)
 Jesse Shelley – drums (2015–2017, 2021–2022)

Timeline

Discography 
Studio albums

Other releases
 "The Hardest Part Is Forgetting Those You Swore You Would Never Forget" and "Humble Servant, Am I" - Dear G-d... demos (2011, self-released)
 "The People Who Share My Name" - Dear G-d... B-side (2013, InVogue Records)

Music videos
 "Dear G-d" (2012, Dear G-d...)
 "The Hardest Part Is Forgetting Those You Swore You Would Never Forget" (2012, Dear G-d...)
 "Salute e Vita" (2013, Dear G-d...)
 "Nothing, Save the Power They're Given" (2013, Dear G-d...)
 "L'exquisite Douleur" (2014, How We Both Wondrously Perish)
 "Mediocre Shakespeare" (2014, How We Both Wondrously Perish)
 "Little Richie" (2015, Being as an Ocean)
 "Death's Great Black Wing Scrapes the Air" (2015, How We Both Wondrously Perish)
 "Dissolve" (2016, Waiting For Morning To Come)
 "This Loneliness Won't Be The Death Of Me" (2017, Dear G-d...)
 "OK" (2018, Waiting For Morning To Come)
 "Alone" (2018, Deluxe Edition of Waiting For Morning To Come)
"Know My Name" (2018, Deluxe Edition of Waiting For Morning To Come)
"Play Pretend" (2019, PROXY: An A.N.I.M.O. Story)

References 

Melodic hardcore musical groups from California
American post-hardcore musical groups
Hardcore punk groups from California
People from Alpine, California
2011 establishments in California
Musical groups established in 2011
Musical quintets
Equal Vision Records artists